Fontaine (formerly Fontain) is an unincorporated community in Shady Grove Township, Greene County, Arkansas, United States. It is located at the western terminus of Arkansas Highway 168 at Arkansas Highway 228.

See also
 List of U.S. place names of French origin

References

Unincorporated communities in Greene County, Arkansas
Unincorporated communities in Arkansas